Slobodan Simović (born 22 May 1989) is a Serbian footballer who  plays for Kolubara.

External links
 
 Profile at Dinamo Minsk website

1989 births
Living people
Sportspeople from Čačak
Serbian footballers
Association football midfielders
Serbian expatriate footballers
RFK Novi Sad 1921 players
FK Spartak Subotica players
FC Dinamo Minsk players
ŠK Slovan Bratislava players
Hapoel Kfar Saba F.C. players
FC Aktobe players
FC BATE Borisov players
Kisvárda FC players
FK Kolubara players
Serbian First League players
Serbian SuperLiga players
Belarusian Premier League players
Slovak Super Liga players
Israeli Premier League players
Kazakhstan Premier League players
Nemzeti Bajnokság I players
Expatriate footballers in Belarus
Expatriate footballers in Slovakia
Expatriate footballers in Israel
Expatriate footballers in Kazakhstan
Expatriate footballers in Hungary
Serbian expatriate sportspeople in Belarus
Serbian expatriate sportspeople in Slovakia
Serbian expatriate sportspeople in Israel
Serbian expatriate sportspeople in Kazakhstan
Serbian expatriate sportspeople in Hungary